Zen From Mars (often abbreviated as ZFM) is an American recording project formed in 2015 by members of Bang Tango, Kik Tracee, Enuff Z'Nuff, Flipp, and Fear Factory.

Background

Formation 
The band was founded in 2015 by, then current, Bang Tango guitarist Drew Fortier, who after demoing songs for what was intended to be Bang Tango's next studio album, decided that the songs would be better fit for a whole different project; which led to Fortier forming Zen From Mars with Kik Tracee vocalist Stephen Shareaux, bassist Chip Z'Nuff, drummer Mike Heller, guitarist Brynn Arens, and pianist Kate Catalina to complete the line up.

Recording 
Recording of the band's debut album began in October 2015. Due to the fact that everyone in the band resides in different parts of the country, each member would self produce and record their parts at their respective home studios. Fortier wrote all of the music for the album using previously completed and fully structured instrumental demos dating back many years; Shareaux then wrote lyrics to the compositions with each member adding their respective parts during the recording process. Recording for the album was finished in the Summer of 2017 and as of 2022, is still not released due to creative differences with front man Stephen Shareaux which led to two completely different versions of the album.

Members 
 Stephen Shareaux - vocals (2015–present)
 Drew Fortier - guitar (2015–present)
 Chip Z'Nuff - bass (2015–present)
 Mike Heller - drums (2015–present)
 Brynn Arens - guitar (2015–present)
 Kate Catalina - keys (2015–present)

Discography 
Singles:
 New Leaf (Matt Wallace Mix) (2016)

References 

 

American alternative rock groups
Alternative metal supergroups
American alternative metal musical groups
American hard rock musical groups
American post-grunge musical groups